Palpada lindneri is a species of flower flies first found in Bolivia. Palpada lindneri is easily distinguished from all neotropical Palpada species by its abdominal pattern.

Description
This description is based on a female holotype. Its head is black, the face being shiny except for a white section under the antenna; its gena is white; frontal lunule is brownish; the frons is shiny on the ventral half, brown on the dorsal third and yellow. Occiput is white ventrally, becoming yellow dorsally. The antenna are brown; basoflagellomere oval, with small basomedial sensory pit on the inner side. The eye is bare except for 2 dense fascia of short black pile.

The thorax is mainly black; postpronotum orange; mesonotum yellow; postalar callus is orange; scutellum is orange and shiny except medially; pleuron is grayish white; katepisternum is generally pilose with the pile not separated into patches; the ampulla, plumula, calypter and haltere are all orange.

The coxae are black; trochanters are orange and shiny; pro- and meso legs orange and shiny, except with black pile intermixed on apical half; the metafemur is swollen, and dark brown except paler orange on its base and apex; protibia is orange on basal third and brown apically, black elsewhere; mesotibia orange; metatibia brown except yellow on base and orange on apex, swollen; protarsus is brownish orange; meso- and metatarsi orange, yellow pilose.

The wings' epaulets and basicosta are orange pilose; they are hyaline and bare except brownish and microtrichose on their apical half.

The abdomen's dorsum is black except for its yellow apical margins on the 2nd through 4th terga; the 1st tergum is gray, 2nd tergum is gray; 3rd and 4th terga are shiny on basal half, dark brownish medially and yellow on apical half; 5th tergum is shiny on the medial third, gray elsewhere.

References

External links

ADW entry

Diptera of South America
Eristalinae
Insects described in 1999
Taxa named by F. Christian Thompson